La telaraña (English title:The cobweb) is a Mexican telenovela produced by Televisa and transmitted by Telesistema Mexicano.

Rafael Llamas and Angelines Fernández starred as protagonists, Paz Villegas starred as main antagonist.

Cast 
Rafael Llamas
Angelines Fernández
Paz Villegas
Roberto Cañedo
Francisco Jambrina

References 

Mexican telenovelas
1961 telenovelas
Televisa telenovelas
1961 Mexican television series debuts
1961 Mexican television series endings
Spanish-language telenovelas